Adoxomyia is a genus of soldier flies in the family Stratiomyidae.

Species

References

Stratiomyidae
Brachycera genera
Taxa named by Kálmán Kertész
Diptera of North America
Diptera of Europe
Diptera of Asia
Diptera of Africa